GAQ may refer to:
 Gao International Airport, in Mali
 Gαq alpha subunit
 Gta’ language